Cyclooxygenase (COX), officially known as prostaglandin-endoperoxide synthase (PTGS), is an enzyme (specifically, a family of isozymes) that is responsible for formation of prostanoids, including thromboxane and prostaglandins such as prostacyclin, from arachidonic acid. A member of the animal-type heme peroxidase family, it is also known as prostaglandin G/H synthase. The specific reaction catalyzed is the conversion from arachidonic acid to prostaglandin H2 via a short-living prostaglandin G2 intermediate.

Pharmaceutical inhibition of COX can provide relief from the symptoms of inflammation and pain. Nonsteroidal anti-inflammatory drugs (NSAIDs), such as aspirin and ibuprofen, exert their effects through inhibition of COX. Those that are specific to the COX-2 isozyme are called COX-2 inhibitors. The active metabolite (AM404) of paracetamol is a COX inhibitor, a fact to which some or all of its therapeutic effect has been attributed.

In medicine, the root symbol "COX" is encountered more often than "PTGS". In genetics, "PTGS" is officially used for this family of genes and proteins because the root symbol "COX" was already used for the cytochrome c oxidase family. Thus, the two isozymes found in humans, PTGS1 and PTGS2, are frequently called COX-1 and COX-2 in medical literature. The names "prostaglandin synthase (PHS)", "prostaglandin synthetase (PHS)", and "prostaglandin-endoperoxide synthetase (PES)" are older terms still sometimes used to refer to COX.

Biology 
In terms of their molecular biology, COX-1 and COX-2 are of similar molecular weight, approximately 70 and 72 kDa, respectively, and having 65% amino acid sequence homology and near-identical catalytic sites. Both proteins have three domains: an N-terminal EGF-like domain, a small 4-helical membrane anchor, and a core heme-peroxidase catalytic domain. Both form dimers. The membrane anchor fixes the proteins into the endoplasmic reticulum (ER) and microsome membrane.

Pharmacology 

COX is a common target for anti-inflammatory drugs.  The most significant difference between the isoenzymes, which allows for selective inhibition, is the substitution of isoleucine at position 523 in COX-1 with valine in COX-2. The smaller Val523 residue in COX-2 allows access to a hydrophobic side-pocket in the enzyme (which Ile523 sterically hinders). Drug molecules, such as DuP-697 and the coxibs derived from it, bind to this alternative site and are considered to be selective inhibitors of COX-2.

Classical NSAIDs 

The main COX inhibitors are the non-steroidal anti-inflammatory drugs.

The classical COX inhibitors are not selective and inhibit all types of COX. The resulting inhibition of prostaglandin and thromboxane synthesis has the effect of reduced inflammation, as well as antipyretic, antithrombotic and analgesic effects. The most frequent adverse effect of NSAIDs is irritation of the gastric mucosa as prostaglandins normally have a protective role in the gastrointestinal tract. Some NSAIDs are also acidic which may cause additional damage to the gastrointestinal tract.

Newer NSAIDs 
Selectivity for COX-2 is the main feature of celecoxib, etoricoxib, and other members of this drug class.  Because COX-2 is usually specific to inflamed tissue, there is much less gastric irritation associated with COX-2 inhibitors, with a decreased risk of peptic ulceration. The selectivity of COX-2 does not seem to negate other side-effects of NSAIDs, most notably an increased risk of kidney failure, and there is evidence that indicates an increase in the risk of heart attack, thrombosis, and stroke through an increase of thromboxane unbalanced by prostacyclin (which is reduced by COX-2 inhibition).  Rofecoxib (brand name Vioxx) was withdrawn in 2004 because of such concerns. Some other COX-2 selective NSAIDs, such as celecoxib, and etoricoxib, are still on the market.

Natural COX inhibition 
Culinary mushrooms, like maitake, may be able to partially inhibit COX-1 and COX-2.

A variety of flavonoids have been found to inhibit COX-2.

Fish oils provide alternative fatty acids to arachidonic acid. These acids can be turned into some anti-inflammatory prostacyclins by COX instead of pro-inflammatory prostaglandins.

Hyperforin has been shown to inhibit COX-1 around 3-18 times as much as aspirin.

Calcitriol (vitamin D) significantly inhibits the expression of the COX-2 gene.

Caution should be exercised in combining low dose aspirin with COX-2 inhibitors due to potential increased damage to the gastric mucosa.  COX-2 is upregulated when COX-1 is suppressed with aspirin, which is thought to be important in enhancing mucosal defense mechanisms and lessening the erosion by aspirin.

Cardiovascular side-effects of COX inhibitors 

COX-2 inhibitors have been found to increase the risk of atherothrombosis even with short-term use. A 2006 analysis of 138 randomised trials and almost 150,000 participants showed that selective COX-2 inhibitors are associated with a moderately increased risk of vascular events, mainly due to a twofold increased risk of myocardial infarction, and also that high-dose regimens of some traditional NSAIDs (such as diclofenac and ibuprofen, but not naproxen) are associated with a similar increase in risk of vascular events.

Fish oils (e.g., cod liver oil) have been proposed as a reasonable alternative for the treatment of rheumatoid arthritis and other conditions as a consequence of the fact that they provide less cardiovascular risk than other treatments including NSAIDs.

Effects of COX on the immune system 
Inhibition of COX-2 using celecoxib has been shown to reduce the immunosuppressive TGFβ expression in hepatocytes attenuating EMT in human hepatocellular carcinoma

See also 
 Cyclooxygenase 1
 Cyclooxygenase 2
 Discovery and development of COX-2 selective inhibitors
 COX-3 (not functional in humans)

References

External links 
 The Cyclooxygenase Protein
 
 GONUTS Page: Cyclooxygenase
 Cyclooxygenase: Proteopedia, life in 3D
 A discussion of the enzymatic mechanism, including interactive 3D models

Prostaglandins
EC 1.14.99
Integral membrane proteins